David Herro is an American businessman and Republican donor.

Personal life and education
Herro grew up in Milwaukee and Fond du Lac, Wisconsin, the son of an accountant and registered nurse. Herro received a bachelor's degree from the University of Wisconsin–Platteville in 1983 and a master's degree in Economics from the University of Wisconsin–Milwaukee in 1985.

Career
After pursuing a master's degree in economics, Herro took a job starting and managing an international stock fund with Principal Financial Group. After,  three plus years at The Principal Group, Herro took a similar position at The State of Wisconsin Investment Board. In 1992 Herro joined Harris Associates. In 1994, Herro was described as the leader of a group of shareholders who worked to remove Maurice Saatchi, The Chairman of the company, from his position on the Saatchi Board of Directors. In 2006 and in 2016 Herro was named International Fund Manager of the Year by Morningstar  and in 2010, Morningstar named Herro the International Stock Fund Manager of the Decade. Herro founded and serves as co-manager of Oakmark International Fund, The Oakmark International Small Cap Fund and The Oakmark Global Select Fund, all advised by Harris Associates.

Political activities
Herro is a strong believer in free-market capitalism, and in supporting individuals, groups and organizations the work for equal access to quality education for underserved youth as well as policies the expand equal opportunities for all. He has supported free market think tanks and candidates as well as  Republican groups.  Herro is a  backer of the American Unity Fund, which supports the legalization of same-sex marriage.

References

Living people
University of Wisconsin–Milwaukee alumni
Year of birth missing (living people)